Siegfried Selberherr (* 3. August 1955 in Klosterneuburg) is an Austrian scientist in the field of microelectronics.
He is a professor at the Institute for Microelectronics of the Technische Universität Wien (TU Wien).
His primary research interest is in modeling and simulation of physical phenomena in the field of microelectronics.

Biography 

Since 1988 Siegfried Selberherr is a chair professor for software technology of microelectronic systems at the TU Wien. He studied electrical engineering at the TU Wien, where he received the degree of Diplom-Ingenieur and the doctoral degree in technical sciences in 1978 and 1981, respectively, and the Habilitation in 1984. Afterwards he was a visiting researcher with the Bell-Labs for some time. Between 1996 and 2020 Prof. Selberherr was a Distinguished Lecturer of the IEEE Electron Devices Society. For many years, Prof. Selberherr was a leader of the Institute for Microelectronics at the TU Wien (now this Institute is headed by his younger colleague Tibor Grasser). In the years 1998-2005 he was the Dean of the Faculty of Electrical Engineering and Information Technology. Moreover, between 2001 and 2018 he was member and deputy chairman of the supervisory board of ams AG and since then serves as scientific advisor to the board. Since 2004 he is a member of the advisory board of the Inter-University Department for Agrobiotechnology (IFA-Tulln).

Accomplishments 
In his scientific career Prof. Selberherr has published, with his teams of researchers, so far over 400 journal papers and
over 1200 articles in conference proceedings, of which more than 250 have been with an invited talk. Additionally, he published 3 books and co-edited more than 40 volumes, and he supervised, so far, more than 100 dissertations.

During his research work Prof. Selberherr has developed a simulator for 'Metal-Oxide-Semiconductor' devices (MINIMOS), in which a mobility model for charge carriers is implemented, which is named after him.
Moreover, he supervised numerous research projects with well-known semiconductor companies and funding agencies, like the Austrian Science Fund (FWF),
the Christian Doppler Research Association (CDG), and the European Research Council (ERC).

Awards 

(Selection)

 2021: 'Fellow' of the Asia-Pacific Artificial Intelligence Association, AAIA
 2021: 'Life Fellow' of the Institute of Electrical and Electronics Engineers, IEEE
 2018: IEEE Cledo Brunetti Award 
 2015: 'Franz Dinghofer Medal' of the Dinghofer Institute
 2014: Marin Drinov decoration of honour on ribbon of the Bulgarian Academy of Sciences
 2013: Full Member of the Academia Europaea
 2011: Silver Commander's Cross of the Order of Merit for Distinguished Service for the Federal Province of Lower Austria
 2009: 'Advanced Grant' of the ERC
 2006: Honorary Doctorate of the University of Niš
 2005: Grand Decoration of Honour for Services to the Republic of Austria
 2004: Full Member of the European Academy of Sciences and Arts
 2001: 'Erwin Schrödinger Award' of the Austrian Academy of Sciences, ÖAW
 1994: 'Wilhelm Exner Medal' of the Austrian Association for Small and Medium-sized Enterprises, ÖGV.
 1993: 'Fellow' of the Institute of Electrical and Electronics Engineers, IEEE
 1986: 'Heinz Zemanek Award' of the Austrian Computer Society, ÖCG
 1983: 'Dr. Ernst Fehrer Award' of the TU Wien

Important publications 

(Selection)

Journals 

 L. Filipovic, S. Selberherr. Thermo-Electro-Mechanical Simulation of Semiconductor Metal Oxide Gas Sensors., Materials, Vol.12, No.15 pp. 2410-1–2410-37, 2019, .
 V. Sverdlov, S. Selberherr. Silicon Spintronics: Progress and Challenges., Physics Reports, Vol.585, pp. 1–40, 2015, .
 H. Ceric, S. Selberherr. Electromigration in Submicron Interconnect Features of Integrated Circuits., Materials Science and Engineering R, Vol.71, pp. 53–86, 2011, .
 V. Sverdlov, E. Ungersboeck, H. Kosina, S. Selberherr. Current Transport Models for Nanoscale Semiconductor Devices., Materials Science and Engineering R,  Vol.58, No.6-7, pp. 228–270, 2008, .
 T. Grasser, T.-W. Tang, H. Kosina, S. Selberherr. A Review of Hydrodynamic and Energy-Transport Models for Semiconductor Device Simulation., Proceedings of the IEEE, Vol.91, No.2, pp. 251–274, 2003, .
 S. Selberherr, A. Schütz, H. Pötzl. MINIMOS – A Two-Dimensional MOS Transistor Analyzer., IEEE Trans.Electron Devices, Vol.ED-27, No.8, pp. 1540–1550, 1980, .

Books 

 M. Nedjalkov, I. Dimov, S. Selberherr. Stochastic Approaches to Electron Transport in Micro- and Nanostructures, Birkhäuser, Basel, 214 pages, 2021, .
 R. Klima, S. Selberherr. Programmieren in C, 3. Auflage, Springer-Verlag, Wien-New York, 366 pages, 2010, .
 J.W. Swart, S. Selberherr, A.A. Susin, J.A. Diniz, N. Morimoto. (Eds.) Microelectronics Technology and Devices, The Electrochemical Society, 661 pages, 2008.
 T. Grasser, S. Selberherr. (Eds.) Simulation of Semiconductor Processes and Devices, Springer-Verlag, Wien-New York, 460 pages, 2007, .
 F. Fasching, S. Halama, S. Selberherr. (Eds.) Technology CAD Systems, Springer-Verlag, Wien-New York, 309 pages, 1993, .
 S. Selberherr. Analysis and Simulation of Semiconductor Devices, Springer-Verlag, Wien-New York, 294 pages, 1984, .

External links 
 Business Card of the Technische Universität Wien
 Full list of publications

References 

1955 births
Living people
Austrian scientists
Members of the European Academy of Sciences and Arts
Fellow Members of the IEEE
People from Klosterneuburg

Recipients of the Grand Decoration for Services to the Republic of Austria
European Research Council grantees